Malsch is a municipality in the district of Rhein-Neckar in Baden-Württemberg in Germany.

Geography

Geographical Location 

Malsch is located in the northwestern corner of the Kraichgau south of the cities of Wiesloch and Walldorf at the border of the Oberrheinischen Tiefebene. The town is located at the foot of the Letzenberg, a hill of 244 m height.

Neighboring towns 

Adjacent towns are, starting from the north clockwise: Malschenberg, Rauenberg, Mühlhausen, Rettigheim, Östringen, Bad Schönborn, Kronau und St. Leon-Rot.

References

External links 

 Gemeinde Malsch
 Bilder rund um Malsch und Letzenberg
 Natur- und Landschaftsschutzgebiet Hochholz-Kapellenbruch

Rhein-Neckar-Kreis